Hammerhead Island is an 800-foot-long (243 m) island in the Aleutian Islands of the U.S. state of Alaska. It has been described in the Aleutian Coast Pilot as "the most prominent" of two islands in Shemya Pass, which separates Nizki and Shemya islands.

References

Semichi Islands
Islands of Alaska
Islands of Unorganized Borough, Alaska